Julian Halwachs (born 25 January 2003) is an Austrian professional footballer who plays as a midfielder for 2. Liga club Liefering.

Career statistics

Club

Notes

References

2003 births
Living people
Austrian footballers
Association football midfielders
2. Liga (Austria) players
TSV Hartberg players
SK Sturm Graz players
FC Red Bull Salzburg players
FC Liefering players